Alien: The Illustrated Story, or simply Alien, is a sixty-four page critically acclaimed graphic novel adaptation of the 1979 science-fiction horror film Alien published by Heavy Metal magazine in 1979. It was scripted by Archie Goodwin and drawn by Walt Simonson. It is the first comic from the Alien franchise and one of few of the franchise's comic publications which is not associated with the long-lasting Aliens line from Dark Horse Comics. The book was a major critical and commercial success and was the first comic to ever be listed on the New York Times Bestsellers list.

Development

Plot
The plot of the graphic novel follows that of the theatrical film, with minor differences.

Reception

Sales
The book was a major success and appeared on the New York Times Mass Market bestseller list (the first comic to ever do so) for eight weeks between July and September 1979, reaching as high as number seven on the list. The book was featured on the list decades before the graphic novel-specific list was created for the New York Times. The book was a rare high-seller for the comic industry in the year 1979 since sales were very down at that point. Of the success of the book artist Walter Simonson expressed that he did not deserve much of the credit he had been given, stating "it was Alien. Anybody could have done it and [made it a best-seller]."

Critical response
The New York Times' review of the book called it "an eye-filling and vibrant graphic portrayal of the gripping and fantastic tale that is Alien." Frank Plowright of The Slings & Arrows Comic Guide expressed that the book remains Heavy Metal's best home-grown work.

Comics writer Warren Ellis named Alien: The Illustrated Story as "the single best adaptation of film into comics ever," calling it "a stunning piece of work, hugely progressive and innovative."

Comic Book Resources (CBR) covered the re-issued edition of the book in a number of articles. Timothy Callahan's review included this analysis: "Archie Goodwin and Walt Simonson crafted a little near-perfect slice of cinema in graphic novel form back in 1979, and they did it by using all the tricks at their disposal." In a detailed analysis of Simonson's art, Greg Burgas characterized Alien: The Illustrated Story as "a really nice book on its own, in some ways better than the movie." And in his rundown of the 15 best Xenomorph comics, Michael Holland of CBR listed Alien: The Illustrated Story as #3, calling it a "must-read" and calling out the few scenes that showed events from the film from a different perspective.

Scott Collura of IGN praised the work of Goodwin and Simonson, citing "Goodwin's lean adaptation of the screenplay" and his ability to "trim bits and pieces to keep the comic moving at a brisk, readable pace, but it never feels like anything has really been cut." Of Simonson, he wrote "the artwork itself is beautiful (in an alien ripping your head open kind of way). . . ," calling it "ornate and detailed" and going on to write, "But the art is also rough and tough at times, which is certainly in keeping with the 'truckers in space' story. It's not uncommon to turn the page and discover another stunning layout: a double-splash page of the Space Jockey's ship. . . ."

Lee Pfeiffer of Cinema Retro praised the book, writing that it "does an admirable job of compacting all of the key story elements without resorting to the kinds of 'artistic license' that often compromise many other comic adaptations of films," and calling the artwork "ground-breaking." Brett Chittenden of Geek Hard praised the book as well, noting "the pacing seems a little different but never in a bad way. It’s very much like Ridley Scott shot his film and then Goodwin and Simonson came in and re-shot the entire film with the same actors and sets and without seeing Scott’s version. And it works really well."

Scott VanderPloeg of AE Index praised the "Original Art Edition" of the book, citing the extras: "a signature plate with Simonson’s in pencil, complete script, colouring examples, an in-depth interview and an afterword by Simonson," and calling it "a bargain at $75."

Alien vs. Predator Central ranked the comic as #10 in the Top 10 Alien Comics list.

Kevin Church of ComicsAlliance reviewed the book positively, calling it the fifth-best comic book adaptation of a film, and noting that:

Art analysis
The work has been highly praised for its art. Dr. Jan Baetens and Dr. Hugo Frey, the authors of the book The Graphic Novel: An Introduction, asserts that Alien: The Illustrated Story's art by Simonson has a distinctive format, particularly the panel and page layout, which serves to provide the audience with a careful and cohesively shaped work which highlights the tension in the plot (as well as for the characters) and brings them to greater attention to the readers. According to Baetens and Frey, Simonson achieves this by utilizing standard comic frames, but then subtly breaking the images outside of the panels and organizing the pages into a more "free-form" style. In contrast to another acclaimed graphic novel, A Contract with God by Will Eisner, so are more traditional grid panels still present at places but are frequently reduced or are abandoned altogether as the story progresses. In their opinion, so does the characters and backgrounds without framing lend the work a confidence and readability that is impressive. Comparing it again to A Contract with God they express that Simonson's highly planned-out but simultaneously free-flowing approach similarly prepares for three double splash pages of major scenes from the story.

Fellow comic book artist Chris Sprouse has praised Simonson's work on the book and stated that the copy he owns had a place of honor in his comic collection in his youth. Sprouse expressed that he loved Simonson work with the technology portrayed in the comic, which he described as accurate, and that he appreciated that Simonson put effort into making the story visually exciting, as opposed to many other movie-tie-in comics that Sprouse had read. Sprouse cited Simonson's work as his greatest inspiration, together with that of Frank Miller. Similarly, cartoonist Kyle Baker said that Alien: The Illustrated Edition was the only comics-format film adaptation he ever liked.

Awards
 Harvey Awards
Best Graphic Album of Previously Published Work (2013)

Legacy
Walt Simonson would later participate in the making of a parody of Alien: The Illustrated Story in the pages of Howard the Duck, in a story named SNAILIAN, which features a snail in the roles of the Alien creature as it menaces Howard.

Editions

References

External links
 Alien: The Illustrated Story (1979) at the Comic Book DB
 Alien: The Illustrated Story at the Grand Comics Database

1979 graphic novels
Alien (franchise) comics
Comics by Archie Goodwin (comics)
Comics by Walt Simonson
Comics based on films
Harvey Award winners
Heavy Metal (magazine)
Horror graphic novels
Science fiction graphic novels